Ayilya Gopalakrishnan, better known by her stage name Ananya, is an Indian actress who appears in Malayalam, Tamil, Telugu and Kannada films. She is also a singer and an archer.

She made her acting debut in the Malayalam film Positive (2008) and also debuted the following year in the Tamil film Naadodigal, which turned out to be a critical and commercial success. She received the Kerala State Television Award for Best Actress in 2012 for the telefilm Doore and the Filmfare Award for Best Supporting Actress – Tamil for Engaeyum Eppothum in 2011.

Early life
Ananya was born as Ayilya to Malayali parents Gopalakrishnan Nair, a noted film producer, and Praseetha in Perumbavoor, Kerala. She has one younger brother Arjun. Her name was taken from her birth star Aslesha, called Ayilyam in Malayalam and Tamil. She appeared as a child artist in one of her father's productions (executive producer), Pai Brothers (1995). Ananya pursued a B.A. degree in Communicative English at St. Xavier's College for Women, Aluva. During her childhood, she was an archer and won the State Championship. While representing her college in a television reality show "Star Wars", she was spotted by various directors and received acting offers. After declining five projects, she decided to give it a try, accepting to act in Positive.

Film career

Her screenname changed to Ananya, when she was working in her debut Tamil film Naadodigal. The film was a high commercial success, and Ananya rose to fame, with her performance in the film being appreciated. She went on to reprise the same role in its Malayalam remake Ithu Nammude Katha. The film Shikkar alongside Mohanlal, gave her a big break in Malayalam. She did some thrilling scenes in the climax of the movie Shikkar that impressed Mohanlal, which made him call her the "Vijayashanti" of Malayalam. She also played a supporting role in Kandahar, which saw her sharing screen space with Mohanlal and Amitabh Bachchan. In 2011, Ananya played one of the female lead roles in Engaeyum Eppothum, which received rave reviews and became a sleeper hit.

In 2014, she appeared in Pulivaal, her first Tamil release after three years.
As of 2018 she has Sigappu Rojakkal 2 in Tamil, Intintaa Annamayya in Telugu, Ameya in Malayalam delayed for release. She is currently gearing up for the release of her Malayalam movie Bhramam.

Awards

Kerala State Television Awards
2012 – Kerala State Television Award for Best Actress : Doore

Filmfare Awards South
2011 – Best Supporting Actress – Tamil: Engaeyum Eppothum

Asianet Film Awards
2010 – Best Supporting Actress : Seniors & Doctor Love

Vijay Awards
2009 – Best Debut Actress: Naadodigal
2011 – Nominated, Vijay Award for Best Supporting Actress: Engaeyum Eppothum

Filmography

Discography

Television

References

External links

 

20th-century Indian actresses
21st-century Indian actresses
Indian film actresses
Actresses from Kochi
Actresses in Tamil cinema
Actresses in Malayalam cinema
Actresses in Telugu cinema
Actresses in Kannada cinema
Actresses in Malayalam television
Indian television actresses
Filmfare Awards South winners
Child actresses in Malayalam cinema
Indian child actresses
Kerala State Television Award winners
Living people
Year of birth missing (living people)